Christopher James McCready (born 5 September 1981, Ellesmere Port, England) is an English former footballer. He played in right, left and central defence.

Career 
Prior to joining Tranmere in 2006, McCready had spent his entire professional career at Crewe, joining the club as a schoolboy and graduating through its prolific youth system. At the age of 14, McCready went to the FA national school at Lilleshall where he played with peers including Joe Cole, he also represented England schoolboys through to under 17 level. McCready made over 70 appearances for Crewe, as well as making eight appearances on loan at Hyde United over two separate spells.

He rejected the offer of a new contract at the end of the 2005–06 season following the club's relegation from the Championship, and joined Tranmere on a one-year contract for 2006–07, after impressing on trial.

McCready established himself as a regular in the Rovers defence, playing in all but four of Tranmere's league games. He re-joined Crewe on a two-year contract on 7 June 2007. At the end of that two-year spell, he was told that he would not be offered a new contract at Crewe, so was released by the club. He joined Northampton on 3 August, after a successful trial.

In January 2010 he rejoined Tranmere Rovers on loan for the remainder of the season.

In July 2010 he signed a 2-year deal with Morecambe.

On 6 May 2014 it was announced that he wasn't to be offered a new contract by Morecambe.

Career statistics 

 Notes

Personal life 
His younger brother Tom is also a professional footballer and has played for a range of clubs, including Exeter City and Chester. He has three children.

References

External links
Chris McCready player profile at ntfc.co.uk

1981 births
Living people
People from Ellesmere Port
English footballers
Association football defenders
Crewe Alexandra F.C. players
Hyde United F.C. players
Tranmere Rovers F.C. players
Northampton Town F.C. players
Morecambe F.C. players
English Football League players